Walter McCrae OBE (1929 - 22 September 2006) was a Scottish footballer and manager best known for managing Kilmarnock from 1968-1973. McCrae also played as a goalkeeper for Kilmarnock Juniors and later served as secretary at Kilmarnock throughout the 1980s.

References

1929 births
2006 deaths
Scottish football managers
Kilmarnock F.C. managers
Officers of the Order of the British Empire